Ceratomegilla is a genus of lady beetles in the family Coccinellidae. There are about eight described species in Ceratomegilla.

Species
These seven species belong to the genus Ceratomegilla:
 Ceratomegilla alpina (A.Villa & G.B.Villa, 1835)
 Ceratomegilla medialis Casey
 Ceratomegilla notata (Laicharting, 1781)
 Ceratomegilla rufocincta (Mulsant, 1850)
 Ceratomegilla similis Casey
 Ceratomegilla strenua Casey
 Ceratomegilla ulkei Crotch, 1873
 Ceratomegilla undecimnotata (Schneider, 1792)

References

Further reading

 
 

Coccinellidae
Articles created by Qbugbot
Coccinellidae genera